In enzymology, a 3-(imidazol-5-yl)lactate dehydrogenase is an enzyme that catalyzes the chemical reaction

(S)-3-(imidazol-5-yl)lactate + NAD(P)+  3-(imidazol-5-yl)pyruvate + NAD(P)H + H+

The 3 substrates of this enzyme are (S)-3-(imidazol-5-yl)lactate, NAD+, and NADP+, whereas its 4 products are 3-(imidazol-5-yl)pyruvate, NADH, NADPH, and H+.

This enzyme belongs to the family of oxidoreductases, specifically those acting on the CH-OH group of donor with NAD+ or NADP+ as acceptor. The systematic name of this enzyme class is (S)-3-(imidazol-5-yl)lactate:NAD(P)+ oxidoreductase. This enzyme is also called imidazol-5-yl lactate dehydrogenase.

References 

 
 

EC 1.1.1
NADPH-dependent enzymes
NADH-dependent enzymes
Enzymes of unknown structure